Juan Ignacio Maegli Agüero (born 21 July 1988, in Guatemala City) is a Guatemalan sailor who competed at the 2008 and 2012 Summer Olympics in the Laser class event where he finished 33rd and 9th respectively. He was the flag bearer for Guatemala during the 2012 Olympic opening ceremony.

College 
He won the ICSA Coed Dinghy National Championship with the College of Charleston in 2013 and was named College Sailor of the Year that same year.

Olympic Games 
He competed for Guatemala at the 2016 Summer Olympics in Laser class event where he finished 8th. He was the flag bearer for Guatemala during the closing ceremony.

He represented Guatemala at the 2020 Summer Olympics serving as a flag bearer during the Parade of Nations. He finished 19th in the Laser division.

His father Juan Maegli was also an Olympic sailor for Guatemala.

Notes

References

External links 
 
 
 

1988 births
Living people
Sportspeople from Guatemala City
Guatemalan male sailors (sport)
Olympic sailors of Guatemala
Sailors at the 2008 Summer Olympics – Laser
Sailors at the 2012 Summer Olympics – Laser
Pan American Games gold medalists for Guatemala
Pan American Games bronze medalists for Guatemala
Sailors at the 2007 Pan American Games
Sailors at the 2011 Pan American Games
Sailors at the 2015 Pan American Games
College of Charleston Cougars sailors
ICSA College Sailor of the Year
Sailors at the 2016 Summer Olympics – Laser
Pan American Games medalists in sailing
Sailors at the 2019 Pan American Games
Medalists at the 2007 Pan American Games
Medalists at the 2011 Pan American Games
Medalists at the 2015 Pan American Games
Medalists at the 2019 Pan American Games
Sailors at the 2020 Summer Olympics – Laser
20th-century Guatemalan people
21st-century Guatemalan people